Rūdolfs Bārda (20 February 1903, Riga – 24 January 1991, Riga) was a Latvian footballer, brother of Edvīns Bārda, Arvīds Bārda and Oskars Bārda.

Biography
Rūdolfs Bārda began his football career in 1922 when he joined JKS Riga - the strongest Latvian football club at the time. His older brothers Arvīds and Edvīns already were playing with the club at that time. After a year with JKS Rūdolfs, Bārda joined the newly founded RFK, together with most of the former first squad JKS Riga players. Playing with RFK from 1923 to 1927 Bārda won three Latvian league titles (1924–1926), from 1923 to 1925 he also played seven matches for Latvia national football team, including the appearance at the 1924 Summer Olympics.

In later years Rūdolfs Bārda switched from playing football to refereeing football matches. In addition to football he also was a good basketball player and played several matches with Latvia national basketball team.

References

External links
 

1903 births
1991 deaths
Footballers from Riga
Basketball players from Riga
People from Kreis Riga
Latvian footballers
Latvia international footballers
Footballers at the 1924 Summer Olympics
Olympic footballers of Latvia
Latvian men's basketball players
Association football forwards